Giovanni Paolo may refer to:

 Giovanni di Paolo (1403–1482) Italian painter
 Pope John Paul I (Giovanni Paolo I), pope
 Giovanni Paolo II (Giovanni Paolo II), pope and saint
 Giovanni Paolo I Sforza (1497–1535) Italian condottiero
 Piazza Giovanni Paolo II, several squares, see List of places named after Pope John Paul II
 Via Giovanni Paolo II, several roads, see List of places named after Pope John Paul II

See also

 
 
 Santi Giovanni e Paolo (disambiguation)
 Giovanni (disambiguation)
 Paolo (disambiguation)
 John Paul (disambiguation)